is a Japanese football player for Fujieda MYFC.

Club statistics
Updated to 23 February 2018.

1Includes Emperor's Cup.
2Includes J. League Cup.
3Includes AFC Champions League.
4Includes FIFA Club World Cup.

References

External links

Profile at Fujieda MYFC

1992 births
Living people
Association football people from Kagoshima Prefecture
Japanese footballers
J1 League players
J2 League players
J3 League players
Sanfrecce Hiroshima players
Gainare Tottori players
AC Nagano Parceiro players
Fujieda MYFC players
Association football midfielders